Charles Henry Williams (August 13, 1844February 2, 1922) was an American farmer and Democratic politician.  He was a member of the Wisconsin State Senate for one term, representing the 13th senatorial district (Dodge County) from 1877 to 1879.

Biography
Born in Burnett, in Dodge County, Wisconsin, he served in various local offices, and was Town Supervisor of Westford, Dodge County, Wisconsin, where he also resided during his senate term. He was elected to one term in the senate and was defeated seeking re-election in 1878.

He died in Minnesota in 1922.

Family

In 1869, Williams married Mary Elizabeth Wallace at Fox Lake, Wisconsin, with whom he raised eleven children.

Electoral history

| colspan="6" style="text-align:center;background-color: #e9e9e9;"| General Election, November 7, 1876

| colspan="6" style="text-align:center;background-color: #e9e9e9;"| General Election, November 5, 1878

References

External links
 
  (his wife)

1844 births
1922 deaths
People from Dodge County, Wisconsin
Farmers from Wisconsin
Democratic Party Wisconsin state senators